Robert McKim (1828 – January 20, 1900) was an Ontario, Canada, farmer and political figure. He represented Wellington North in the Legislative Assembly of Ontario as a Liberal member from 1867 to 1872 and Wellington West from 1879 to 1886.

He was born and grew up in Sligo, Ireland. In 1852, he married Margaret Shannon. He was a justice of the peace and also served as reeve for Peel Township. McKim resigned his seat in the provincial legislature in 1874 to compete unsuccessfully in Wellington Centre for a seat in the federal parliament. He was defeated in the 1875 provincial election and reelected in 1878. In 1884, McKim turned over to the speaker of the house a large sum of money that he had been paid to vote against the government. He died in Guelph in 1900.

References

External links

The Annals of the town of Guelph, 1827-1877
The Canadian parliamentary companion, 1885 JA Gemmill
Canada and its provinces. Volume 17, A Shortt, AG Doughtty (1914)

1828 births
1900 deaths
Irish emigrants to pre-Confederation Ontario
Ontario Liberal Party MPPs
Politicians from County Sligo